S2, also known as S0–2, is a star in the star cluster close to the supermassive black hole Sagittarius A* (Sgr A*), orbiting it with a period of 16.0518 years, a semi-major axis of about 970 au, and a pericenter distance of 17 light hours (18 Tm or 120 au) – an orbit with a period only about 30% longer than that of Jupiter around the Sun, but coming no closer than about four times the distance of Neptune from the Sun. Based on its spectral type (B0V ~ B3V), it probably has a mass of 10 to 15 solar masses.

Its changing apparent position has been monitored since 1995 by two groups (at UCLA and at the Max Planck Institute for Extraterrestrial Physics) as part of an effort to gather evidence for the existence of a supermassive black hole in the center of the Milky Way galaxy. The accumulating evidence points to Sgr A* as being the site of such a black hole. By 2008, S2 had been observed for one complete orbit. In 2020, partway through its next orbit, the GRAVITY collaboration released an analysis showing full agreement with Schwarzschild geodesics.

A team of astronomers, mainly from the Max Planck Institute for Extraterrestrial Physics, used observations of S2's orbital dynamics around Sgr A* to measure the distance from the Earth to the galactic center. They determined it to be  in close agreement with prior determinations by other methods.

S2 was precisely tracked during its May 2018 close approach to Sgr A*, with results in accord with general relativity predictions.

Nomenclature
The designation S0–2 was first used in 1998. S0 indicates a star within one arc-second of Sgr A*, indicating the galactic centre, and S0–2 was the second closest star seen at the time of the measurements. The star had been catalogued simply as S2 a year earlier, the second of eleven infrared sources near the galactic centre, numbered approximately anti-clockwise. It is a coincidence that the star is numbered "2"  in both lists; other catalogs number it differently.

Orbit
The highly eccentric orbit of S2 will give astronomers an opportunity to test for various effects predicted by general relativity and even extra-dimensional effects. These effects reached a maximum at closest approach, which occurred in mid-2018.

The motion of S2 is also useful for detecting the presence of other objects near to Sgr A*. It is believed that there are thousands of stars, as well as dark stellar remnants (stellar black holes, neutron stars, white dwarfs) distributed in the volume through which S2 moves. These objects will perturb S2's orbit, causing it to deviate gradually from the Keplerian ellipse that characterizes motion around a single point mass. So far, the strongest constraint that can be placed on these remnants is that their total mass comprises less than one percent of the mass of the supermassive black hole.

2018 pericentre passage
In 2018, S2 made its closest approach to Sgr A*, reaching 7650 km/s or almost 3% of the speed of light, while passing the black hole at a distance of just 120 AU or about 1400 times its Schwarzschild radius. S2 reached its pericenter on May 19, 2018, while its velocity in the line of sight from Earth peaked in April, and later hit its minimum in late August and early September.

Independent analyses by the GRAVITY collaboration (led by Reinhard Genzel) and the KECK/UCLA Galactic Center Group (led by Andrea Ghez) revealed a combined transverse Doppler and gravitational redshift up to 200 km/s/c, in agreement with general relativity predictions.

Additional analysis has revealed a Schwarzschild precession of 12 arcminutes (0.2 degrees) in S2's orbit caused by the close passage, fully consistent with general relativity.

S0–102

In 2012, a star called S0–102 (or S55) was found to be orbiting even closer to the Milky Way's central supermassive black hole than S0–2 does. At one-sixteenth the brightness of S0–2, S0–102 was not initially recognized because it required many more years of observations to distinguish it from its local infrared background.  S0–102 has an orbital period of 11.5 years, even shorter than that of S0–2. Of all the stars orbiting the black hole, only these two have their orbital parameters and trajectories fully known in all three dimensions of space. The discovery of two stars orbiting the central black hole so closely with their orbits fully described is of extreme interest to astronomers, as the pair together will allow much more precise measurements on the nature of gravity and general relativity around the black hole than would be possible from using S0–2 alone.

A still closer star S62 has since been discovered with an orbital period of 9.9 years.

Image gallery

See also
 Lists of stars

References

External links
 
 
 

B-type main-sequence stars
Sagittarius (constellation)
Tests of general relativity